Anastrepha bivittata is a species of tephritid or fruit flies in the genus Anastrepha of the family Tephritidae. The only known host plant is Gessiopermum laeve (Vell.) Miers.

References

Trypetinae